Angelus of St. Francis Mason, O.F.M., was an English Franciscan friar and writer active in the 17th century.

Life

He was born Richard Mason in the county of Wiltshire, England, in 1599. Like a number of English Roman Catholics under the Penal laws who desired to enter religious life, he went to Douai in the County of Flanders, then the Spanish Netherlands. There he entered the Order of Friars Minor, being clothed in the habit and given his new name. He was professed in 1625, and ordained to the priesthood four years later.

There is the suggestion in some documents of the Order that he served for a time in Ireland after this, possibly himself being of Irish descent.

Mason rapidly became eminent in the Order, being created a Doctor of Divinity and appointed successively to the high administrative offices of Definitor, Guardian and Visitor to the Franciscan province of Brabant. He was elected Minister Provincial of the English province of the Franciscan Order in 1659. In that office, he visited Paris in an unsuccessful attempt to obtain permission for the settlement there of a colony of English Franciscan Sisters from their convent in Nieuwpoort in Flanders, where he had served as their confessor. From 1662-75 he lived in England, as domestic chaplain to Lord Henry Arundell, 3rd Baron Arundell of Wardour, after which period he retired to the friary at Douai, where he died on 30 December 1678.

Works

Mason displayed industry in both original composition and the compilation of devotional manuals. The latter include his Sacrarium privilegiorum quorundam Seraphico P. S. Francisco ... indultorum (Douai, 1636), a guide to the indulgences granted to members of the Franciscan Order. He later wrote the Manuale Tertii Ordinis S. Francisci(Douai, 1643), a commentary and meditations on the Rule of the Third Order of St. Francis, in which he gives guidance to Franciscan tertiaries on their way of life. This he soon translated into English as The Rule of Penance of the Seraphical Father St. Francis (Douai, 1644).

Among his historical writings are "Certamen Seraphicum Provinciae Angliae pro Sancta Dei Ecclesia" (Douai, 1649), a review of distinguished English Franciscan martyrs and polemical writers, and "Apologia pro Scoto Anglo" (Douai, 1656). The last-named work has for its main scope the establishment (against John Colgan) of the thesis that Duns Scotus was not a Scotsman, but an Englishman.

His Liturgical Discourse of the Holy Sacrifice of the Mass (s. 1, 1670, dedicated to Henry, Lord Arundell of Wardour, "Master of the Horse to our late Queen Mother Henrietta Maria"), was abridged in the Holy Altar and Sacrifice Explained which Friar Pacificus Baker, O.F.M., published at the request of Bishop James Talbot in London in 1768.

References
Gillow, Joseph, Bibl. Dict. Eng. Cath.
Harris, Walter, Ware's Writers of Ireland, 336
Oliver, George, Collections (London, 1845), 193, 229, 541, 554, 568
Wadding, Luke, Script. Ord. Minor.

Notes

1599 births
1678 deaths
English Friars Minor
People from Wiltshire
17th-century English Roman Catholic priests
English religious writers
Franciscan writers